Stevenston railway station is a railway station serving the town of Stevenston, North Ayrshire, Scotland. The station is managed by ScotRail and is owned by Network Rail.

History 
The station was opened on 27 July 1840 by the Ardrossan Railway. The station once included several buildings, a passenger footbridge and a level crossing. A chord line to "Dubs Junction" on the Glasgow, Paisley, Kilmarnock and Ayr Railway route towards  was used by an Ardrossan to Irvine &  service until April 1964, when it fell victim to the Beeching Axe.

Today the level crossing is still in operation, the footbridge has been removed and basic shelters now serve the platforms.

Services 
Monday to Saturday daytimes there is a half-hourly service eastbound to Glasgow Central and hourly westbound to Largs and Ardrossan Harbour respectively.

On Sundays there is an hourly service eastbound to Glasgow Central and westbound to Largs, plus a limited additional service to Ardrossan Harbour to connect with the ferry sailings to Brodick.

References

Notes

Sources

External links
Video footage of Stevenston station.

Railway stations in North Ayrshire
Former Glasgow and South Western Railway stations
Railway stations in Great Britain opened in 1840
Railway stations served by ScotRail
SPT railway stations
Ardrossan−Saltcoats−Stevenston